Cahan is an Irish and Jewish surname. Notable people with the surname include:

 Abraham Cahan (1860–1951), American writer and politician
 Bill Cahan, American architect, graphic designer, and founder of design firm Cahan and Associates
 Charles Cahan (1861–1944), Canadian politician
 Larry Cahan (1933–1992), Canadian ice hockey player